Miloš Zličić (born 29 December 1999) is a Serbian football forward who plays for Smederevo 1924. He is a younger brother of Lazar Zličić.

Club career

Vojvodina
Born in Novi Sad, Zličić passed Vojvodina youth school and joined the first team at the age of 16. Previously, he was nominated for the best player of the "Tournament of Friendship", played in 2015. He made his senior debut in a friendly match against OFK Bačka during the spring half of the 2015–16 season, along with a year younger Mihajlo Nešković. Zličić made an official debut for Vojvodina in the 16th fixture of the 2016–17 Serbian SuperLiga season, played on 19 November 2016 against Novi Pazar.

Loan to Cement
In July 2018, Zličić joined the Serbian League Vojvodina side Cement Beočin on half-year loan deal. Zličić made his debut in an official match for Cement on 18 August, in the first round of the new season of the Serbian League Vojvodina, in a defeat against Omladinac. He scored his first senior goal on 25 August, in victory against Radnički.

International career
Zličić was called in Serbia U15 national team squad during the 2014, and he also appeared for under-16 national team between 2014 and 2015. He was also member of a U17 level later. After that, he was member of a U18 level, and scored goal against Slovenia U18.

Career statistics

References

External links
 
 

1999 births
Living people
Footballers from Novi Sad
Association football forwards
Serbian footballers
FK Vojvodina players
FK ČSK Čelarevo players
FK Cement Beočin players
FK Hajduk Kula players
OFK Bečej 1918 players
OFK Bačka players
FK Sloboda Tuzla players
Serbian SuperLiga players
Serbian First League players
Premier League of Bosnia and Herzegovina players
Serbian expatriate footballers
Expatriate footballers in Bosnia and Herzegovina
Serbian expatriate sportspeople in Bosnia and Herzegovina